Kazys Škirpa (18 February 1895 – 18 August 1979) was a Lithuanian military officer and diplomat. He is best known as the founder of the Lithuanian Activist Front (LAF) and his involvement in the attempt to establish Lithuanian independence in June 1941.

Army career
During World War I, he was mobilized into the Imperial Russian Army and attempted to form Lithuanian detachments in Petrograd. After Lithuania declared independence in 1918, he returned and volunteered during the Lithuanian Wars of Independence. In January 1919, Škirpa was commandant of Vilnius and men under his command raised the flag of Lithuania on Gediminas' Tower on 1 January 1919. It was the first time the flag was raised in Vilnius, the historical capital of the Grand Duchy of Lithuania, and 1 January is commemorated as the flag day in Lithuania. In 1920, as a member of the Lithuanian Peasant Popular Union, he was elected to the Constituent Assembly of Lithuania. After that he decided to pursue a military education in Institute of Technology in Zurich, Higher Officers' Courses in Kaunas, and Royal Military Academy (Belgium). Upon graduation in 1925, he worked as Chief of the General Staff, but was forced to resign after the 1926 Lithuanian coup d'état, because he actively opposed it by trying to gather a military force to protect the government.

Political career
Later he served as a Lithuanian representative to Germany (1927–1930), League of Nations (1937), Poland (1938), and again Germany (1938–1941). After Soviet Union occupied Lithuania in 1940, Škirpa fled to Germany and formed the Lithuanian Activist Front (LAF), a short-lived resistance organization whose goal was to liberate Lithuania and re-establish its independence by working with the Nazis. According to Victims of Communism Memorial Foundation, he was a primary source of the secret part of the Molotov–Ribbentrop Pact which he sent to the Latvian foreign minister Vilhelms Munters in 1939. When Nazis invaded the Soviet Union in June 1941, many members of LAF cooperated with the Nazis and killed thousands of Lithuanian Jews (see the Holocaust in Lithuania). He was named prime minister in the Provisional Government of Lithuania; however, the Germans placed him under house arrest and did not allow him to leave for Lithuania. He moved from Berlin to southern Germany and was allowed a short visit to Kaunas only in October 1943. In June 1944, he was arrested for sending a memorandum to the Nazi officials asking to replace German authorities in Lithuania with a Lithuanian government.

Later life 
After the war, he went to Paris and from there to Dublin, where he taught Russian at the University of Dublin. In 1949, he emigrated to the United States. He worked at the Library of Congress. His memoir about the 1941 independence movement was published in 1975. Originally interred in Washington, D.C., his remains were returned to Kaunas in June 1995, where he was reburied in Petrašiūnai Cemetery. The state-sponsored ceremony included honor guards at Vytautas the Great War Museum and speeches by then Lithuanian Prime minister Adolfas Šleževičius and Defense Minister Linas Linkevičius.

Controversy
In 1991, a street in Eiguliai district of Kaunas was renamed after Škirpa. In 2001, a memorial plaque was affixed to the building where he worked from 1925–1926. In 1998, an alley in Vilnius near the Vilnius Castle Complex was also named after Škirpa commemorating his raising of the flag of Lithuania in 1919. These dedications have caused controversy in Lithuania due to his anti-Semitic writings. The issue of the plaque in Kaunas was raised in 2015. However, the government-funded Genocide and Resistance Research Centre of Lithuania denied his role in the Holocaust in Lithuania but acknowledged anti-Semitism in his writings, and the plaque remained. Public discussions about the alley in Vilnius were initiated in 2016. After a national debate and controversy, the city council led by the mayor Remigijus Šimašius voted to rename the alley in Vilnius to "Trispalvė" ("Tricolour", a reference to the flag of Lithuania) in July 2019. The street in Kaunas was not renamed.

References

Further reading 
 
 

1895 births
1979 deaths
Ambassadors of Lithuania to Germany
Burials at Petrašiūnai Cemetery
Lithuanian Activist Front members
Lithuanian Army officers
Lithuanian collaborators with Nazi Germany
Lithuanian diplomats
Lithuanian emigrants to the United States
Lithuanian independence activists
Lithuanian people of World War II
Nazi concentration camp survivors
Prime Ministers of Lithuania
People from Pasvalys District Municipality
People from Kovno Governorate
Russian military personnel of World War I